The Red Hot Chili Peppers is the self-titled debut studio album by American rock band Red Hot Chili Peppers, released on August 10, 1984, via EMI America and Enigma Records. The album was produced by Gang of Four guitarist Andy Gill, and is the only Peppers album to feature Jack Sherman on guitar. Sherman was in the band as a replacement for founding member Hillel Slovak, who'd left the band along with founding drummer Jack Irons before the album was recorded. After the tour for this album, Sherman was fired and Slovak rejoined the band. The album also features founding members Anthony Kiedis on vocals and Flea on bass, as well as Cliff Martinez on drums.

"Get Up and Jump" was the only single released from the album, but a music video was made for the song "True Men Don't Kill Coyotes." The album has been credited as the first release from the funk metal genre.

Writing and recording
The band was often at odds with producer Andy Gill over the musical direction of the album. Anthony Kiedis was disappointed with the overall sound, thinking that it lacked the raw energy of the band's original 1983 demo tape. In his 2004 autobiography Scar Tissue, Kiedis recalled, "One day, I got a glimpse of Gill's notebook, and next to the song 'Police Helicopter', he'd written 'Shit.' I was demolished that he had dismissed that as shit. Police Helicopter was a jewel in our crown. It embodied the spirit of who we were, which was this kinetic, stabbing, angular, shocking assault force of sound and energy. Reading his notes probably sealed the deal in our minds that 'Okay, now we're working with the enemy', It became very much him against us, especially Flea and me. It became a real battle to make the record."

Reception

The album failed to chart on the Billboard 200, reaching  201 (meaning it "bubbled under" the main album chart for eight weeks in the autumn of 1984). The album received college airplay and MTV rotation, and built the band's fan base. The reviews that were published of the album were mixed, with the first issue of Spin magazine giving, according to Anthony Kiedis in his autobiography Scar Tissue, a positive review. Stephen Thomas Erlewine of AllMusic later wrote that "their first effort didn't quite gel into a cohesive album". As of 2007, it had sold about 300,000 copies worldwide. Kiedis and Flea have said over the years that they prefer the demo versions of most of the songs, which were recorded with the original lineup featuring Hillel Slovak and Jack Irons; however, the band acknowledged in various books that Jack Sherman's contributions to the band, particularly his knowledge of funk music and music theory, were instrumental in the band's development that were not present with Slovak.

Gwen Dickey, better known by her stage name, Rose Norwalt, provides backing vocals on "Mommy Where's Daddy?" Dickey was the singer for the 1970s group Rose Royce. On live performances of the song, her lines are performed by Flea.

Track listing

Personnel
Red Hot Chili Peppers
Anthony Kiedis – lead vocals
Jack Sherman – guitar, backing vocals
Flea – bass, backing vocals
Cliff Martinez – drums

2003 edition bonus tracks (tracks 12–16)
Anthony Kiedis – vocals
Hillel Slovak – guitar, talk box
Flea – bass
Jack Irons – drums

Additional musicians
Keith Barry – horn arrangements and viola
Cliff Brooks – timbales and congas
Gwen Dickey – backing vocals (tracks 1 & 7)
Patrick English – trumpet
Kenny Flood – tenor saxophone
Phil Ranelin – trombone

Recording personnel
Andy Gill – producer
Spit Stix – producer (demos)
Dave Jerden – engineer
Carolyn Collins – assistant engineer
Rob Stevens – mixing
Barry Conley – mixing assistant
Greg Fulginiti – mastering

Artwork
Gary Panter – cover art
Edward Colver – photography
Howard Rosenberg – photography
Henry Marquez – art direction

2003 remastered version personnel
Kevin Flaherty – producer for reissue
Ron McMaster – remastering
Kenny Nemes – project manager
Michelle Azzopardi – art direction
Kristine L. Barnard – design
John Dinser – photo imaging and additional design
Edward Colver – photography
Howard Rosenberg – photography
EMI Archives – photography

References

External links

1984 debut albums
Albums produced by Andy Gill
Albums with cover art by Gary Panter
EMI America Records albums
Enigma Records albums
Funk rock albums by American artists
Funk metal albums
Red Hot Chili Peppers albums